Kiryat Sanz is a Haredi Jewish neighborhood in Jerusalem. It is located in the northwestern part of Jerusalem.

The neighborhood was established in 1965 by Jewish immigrants from Sanz in Galicia, largely as a center for their followers.

The neighborhood is bordered by the neighborhoods Kiryat Belz and Ezrat Torah.

Rabbinic presence
Rabbi Dov Berel Weiss, son-in-law of the first Klausenburger Rebbe, Rabbi Yekusiel Yehudah Halberstam, was the Gaon Av Beth Din of Kiryat Sanz.

Landmarks
EYAHT College of Jewish Studies for Women, founded by Rebbetzin Denah Weinberg
The Yad Eliezer poverty-relief organization was founded and operated in Kiryat Sanz from 1980 to 2000 by residents Rabbi Yaakov and Hadassah Weisel. The organization is now headquartered in the Shmuel HaNavi neighborhood.

References

Neighbourhoods of Jerusalem